Austin Allen (born November 10, 1998) is an American football tight end for the Green Bay Packers of the National Football League (NFL). He played college football at Nebraska.

Early years
Allen grew up in Phillips, Nebraska and attended Aurora High School, where he played football and basketball. As a junior, he caught 41 passes for 507 yards and eight touchdowns. Allen committed to play college football at Nebraska over offers from Iowa, Iowa State, UCLA, and UCF.

College career
Allen redshirted his true freshman season. As a redshirt freshman he caught two passes for 54 yards. Allen played in all 12 of Nebraska's games and had seven receptions for 83 yards during his redshirt sophomore season. He started seven games as a redshirt junior and caught 18 passes for 236 yards and one touchdown. In his redshirt senior season Allen set school records for tight ends with 38 receptions and 602 receiving yards and scored three touchdowns. He was named first-team All-Big Ten Conference and the Kwalick–Clark Tight End of the Year at the end of the season.

Professional career

New York Giants
Allen was signed by the New York Giants as an undrafted free agent on April 30, 2022, shortly after the conclusion of the 2022 NFL Draft. He was waived on August 30, 2022 and signed to the practice squad the next day. On October 18, 2022, the Giants released Allen from their practice squad.

Green Bay Packers
On January 3, 2023, Allen was signed to the Green Bay Packers practice squad. He signed a reserve/future contract on January 10, 2023.

References

External links
 Green Bay Packers bio
Nebraska Cornhuskers bio

1998 births
Living people
People from Aurora, Nebraska
Players of American football from Nebraska
American football tight ends
Nebraska Cornhuskers football players
New York Giants players